Ilamai Kaalangal is a 1983 Indian Tamil-language film written and directed by Manivannan. The film stars Mohan, Sasikala and Rohini. It was released on 19 August 1983.

Plot 

Rosie and Raghu are college mates that fall in love. Rosie's father, Inspector David, is aware of their love. He approves but requests the couple to focus on their education first and foremost. Raghu's parents expect him to marry Meera. Raghu's friends and fellow college students, Kannan, Jana and two others gang rape a young woman that ran away from home with her boyfriend. The young couple commit suicide and Inspector David finds clues to tie students from the college to the crime. To distract from the investigation, the rapists arrange for a college strike using Raghu as an excuse. The strike turns violent and Kannan kills Inspector David. Rosie dumps Raghu as she thinks he started the strike. She eventually gets a job working for Kannan who pursues her romantically. Jana loses his mind with guilt and wanders the streets. Raghu is withdrawn and depressed. Raghu's father insists he marry Meera or leave the house. Raghu chooses to leave and struggles to make ends meet. Kannan, Raghu and Rosie's paths cross continually until a culminating event forces a confrontation.

Cast 
Mohan as Raghu
Sasikala as Rosie
Rohini as Meera
Balaji as Kannan
Anuradha
Vennira Aadai Moorthy
A.R.S as Inspector David
Sukumari as Stella
Senthamarai as Raghu's father
S. N. Parvathy as Raghu's mother
Senthil
Meghala
 Janagaraj as Jana

Production 
Ilamai Kaalangal is the debut film for Balaji, and Sasikala and Rohini in leading roles.

Soundtrack 
The soundtrack was composed by Ilaiyaraaja. The song "Eeramana Rojave" is set in the Carnatic raga known as Madhyamavati, "Isaimedaiyil Intha Velayil" is set in Darbari Kanada, "Padavanthatho Gaanam" is set in Chandrakauns, and "Ragavane Ramana" is set to Suddha Dhanyasi.

Release and reception 
Ilamai Kaalangal was released on 19 August 1983. Jayamanmadhan of Kalki appreciated Ilaiyaraaja's music and Sabhapathy's cinematography.

References

Bibliography

External links 
 

1980 films
1980s Tamil-language films
1983 films
Films directed by Manivannan
Films scored by Ilaiyaraaja